David Sydney Maddicott (born 27 March 1953) is a British diplomat who was High Commissioner to Cameroon 2006–09.

From 1976 to 1990, he worked in sales and marketing for Rank Xerox and Pitney Bowes, before proceeding to undertake postgraduate studies between 1990 and 1993. He was then a self-employed consultant between 1993 and 1994.

He entered the Foreign & Commonwealth Office in 1994 as Head of Section for the Economic Relations and United Nations Departments. In 1996, he went on secondment to the Canadian Department of Foreign Affairs and International Trade.

In 1997, Maddicott became the Head of the Political and Information Sections in Ottawa, Ontario, Canada; a post he held until his promotion in 2000 to Deputy Head of the Latin American and Caribbean Department at the FCO. He was later Head of the Caribbean Team.

Between 2003 and 2005, Maddicott was Senior Duty Manager of the Response Centre at the FCO, becoming British High Commissioner to Cameroon (and non-resident Ambassador to  Central African Republic, Chad and Gabon) in 2006.

Maddicott is married to Elizabeth, with whom he has four sons and one daughter. His daughter, Frances, was born in 1982. His sons, Edmund, Edgar, Edwin, and Alfred were born in 1980, 1984, 1990 and 1993 respectively.

References

1953 births
Living people
Alumni of University College London
High Commissioners of the United Kingdom to Cameroon
Ambassadors of the United Kingdom to Chad
Ambassadors of the United Kingdom to Gabon